This is a list of the winners and nominees of the BAFTA Award for Best Animated Film.

Winners and nominees

2000s

2010s

2020s

See also
 Academy Award for Best Animated Feature
 Golden Globe Award for Best Animated Feature Film
 Annie Award for Best Animated Feature
 Producers Guild of America Award for Best Animated Motion Picture
 Critics' Choice Movie Award for Best Animated Feature
 Japan Media Arts Festival
 Animation Kobe
 Tokyo Anime Award
 List of animated feature films awards

References

British Academy Film Awards
 
Awards for best animated feature film
Awards established in 2007